Hippotion balsaminae is a moth of the family Sphingidae. It is common in most habitats throughout the Ethiopian Region, including Madagascar.

The larvae feed on the leaves of Jussieua repens.

References

 Pinhey, E. (1962): Hawk Moths of Central and Southern Africa. Longmans Southern Africa, Cape Town.

Hippotion
Moths described in 1856
Moths of Africa
Moths of Madagascar